Glade Park is an unincorporated community and a U.S. Post Office located in Mesa County, Colorado, United States.  The Glade Park Post Office has the ZIP Code 81523.

Geography
The views on the drive are spectacular, encompassing red sandstone canyons and sheer rock faces. Due to the elevation,  the temperature in Glade Park is typically ~10 °F cooler than in Grand Junction, though in winter temperatures can be significantly warmer than in Grand Junction if an inversion layer is present in the Grand Valley below.

Community
Glade Park is a former western Colorado ranching and farming community. As precipitation has declined,  much of the ranch land has been split up into 35-40 acre parcels on which homes now stand. Area zoning permits a density of one house per  parcel. There is no municipal water system available in Glade Park; most houses have water wells. Some homes harvest their own water off the roof.

The remoteness of the area and the creativity of its residents, has made Glade Park home to an unusually high number of alternative and sustainably-constructed homes, including Earthships, rammed earth construction, straw bale, geodesic dome, earthen berm and log construction.  The distance of many of the building lots from electrical infrastructure has stimulated construction of a number of energy self-sufficient homes.

References

External links
Community website

Unincorporated communities in Mesa County, Colorado
Unincorporated communities in Colorado